Live at the Greek Theatre 2008 is a live and video album released by Ringo Starr & His All-Starr Band in 2010.

Overview
It is one of few albums with the All-Starr Band that Ringo Starr has released on a major label, this one being released on Universal Music Group, as well as his 2008 studio album Liverpool 8, which was released under Capitol Records.

News of the album was originally revealed on the Beatles' official website as well as Starr's official website.

The audio version removes several of the songs that were sung at the concert and that appeared on the video version.

Track listing 
Introduction / "With a Little Help from My Friends" (Lennon–McCartney) / "It Don't Come Easy" (Richard Starkey) (4:24)
"What Goes On" (Lennon, McCartney, Starkey) (3:48)
"The Stroke" (Billy Squier) (6:55)
 Performed by Billy Squier
"Free Ride" (Dan Hartman) (5:23)
 Performed by Edgar Winter
"Dream Weaver" (Gary Wright) (5:09)
 Performed by Gary Wright
"Boys" (Luther Dixon, Wes Farrell) (4:03)
"Pick Up the Pieces" (Roger Ball) (6:12)
 Performed by Hamish Stuart
"Act Naturally" (Johnny Russell, Voni Morrison) (3:25)
"Yellow Submarine" (Lennon–McCartney) (3:20)
"Never Without You" (Starkey, Hudson, Nicholson) (5:26)
"I Wanna Be Your Man" (Lennon–McCartney) (3:40)
"Who Can It Be Now" (Colin Hay) (4:55)
 Performed by Colin Hay
"Photograph" (George Harrison, Richard Starkey) (3:56)
"Oh My My" (Richard Starkey, Vini Poncia) (5:02)
"With a Little Help from My Friends" / "Give Peace a Chance" (Lennon–McCartney) (5:18)

The 2008 All-Starr Band Line Up
 Ringo Starr – drums, vocals
 Billy Squier – guitar, bass, vocals
 Colin Hay – guitar, vocals
 Edgar Winter – keyboards, saxophone, vocals
 Gary Wright – keyboards, keytar, vocals
 Hamish Stuart – bass, guitar, vocals
 Gregg Bissonette – drums, vocals

References

Ringo Starr live albums
2010 live albums
Universal Music Group live albums
Albums recorded at the Greek Theatre (Los Angeles)
Albums produced by Ringo Starr
Hip-O Records live albums
Ringo Starr & His All-Starr Band albums